Republic of Guinea (also referred to as Guinea-Conackry) requires its residents to register their motor vehicles and display vehicle registration plates.

Regional Codes

References

Guinea
Transport in Guinea
Guinea transport-related lists